This is a list of people executed by lethal injection in Missouri, comprising 95 convicted murderers since 1976, when the US Supreme Court reaffirmed the death penalty with its decision in Gregg v. Georgia.

Table

See also 

 Capital punishment in Missouri
 Capital punishment in the United States

Notes

References

External links 
 Capital Punishment in Missouri (Missourinet)

Missouri
People executed